San Juan del Monte may refer to:
San Juan, Metro Manila, formerly as San Juan del Monte, a city in the Philippines
Battle of San Juan del Monte, 1896
San Juan del Monte, Province of Burgos, a municipality and town located in Castile and León, Spain